Alexandra Aldridge (born May 7, 1994) is an American ice dancer. With former partner Daniel Eaton, she is the 2014 Four Continents bronze medalist, a two-time (2012, 2013) World Junior bronze medalist, the 2012 JGP Final bronze medalist, and a two-time U.S. national junior champion.

Career

Partnership with Eaton 
Aldridge/Eaton teamed up in May 2009. In their first season together, they won the U.S. novice title. The following season, they debuted on the Junior Grand Prix series, placing 6th and 4th in France and England, respectively. They finished 5th on the junior level at the 2011 U.S. Championships.

During the 2011–12 season, Aldridge/Eaton won bronze in Latvia and silver in Austria on the Junior Grand Prix circuit. They won the junior title at the 2012 U.S. Championships. They competed at the 2012 World Junior Championships and won the bronze medal ahead of Anna Yanovskaya / Sergei Mozgov.

In 2012–13, Aldridge/Eaton won gold medals at their JGP events in Lake Placid, USA and Slovenia. Their results qualified them for the 2012–13 JGP Final in Sochi, Russia, where they won the bronze medal. They won another bronze medal at the 2013 World Junior Championships.

Aldridge/Eaton placed sixth in their senior international debut at the 2013 Ondrej Nepela Trophy and then fifth in their sole GP event, the 2013 Cup of China. They finished 5th at the 2014 U.S. Championships and were assigned to the 2014 Four Continents where they won the bronze medal. Aldridge/Eaton joined the U.S. team to the 2014 World Championships as a result of the withdrawal of Meryl Davis / Charlie White and injury to Madison Hubbell (first alternate with Zachary Donohue). They trained at the Detroit Skating Club in Bloomfield Hills, Michigan, coached by Anjelika Krylova, until the end of the season.

Aldridge/Eaton made a coaching change in July 2014, joining Marina Zueva, Massimo Scali, Johnny Johns, and Oleg Epstein at Canton, Michigan's Arctic Edge. After winning gold at the U.S. Classic, they competed at two Grand Prix events, placing sixth at the 2014 Skate Canada International and seventh at the 2014 Rostelecom Cup. They finished sixth at the 2015 U.S. Championships. They announced the end of their partnership on January 30, 2015.

In August 2017, Aldridge/Eaton resumed training together at the Detroit Skating Club, coached by Krylova and Camerlengo.

Partnership with Blackmer 
On July 31, 2015, IceNetwork.com announced that Aldridge had teamed up two months earlier with former pair skater Matthew Blackmer. Anjelika Krylova, Pasquale Camerlengo, and Natalia Annenko-Deller served as their coaches. Blackmer passed sixteen dance tests in one week in order to compete with her. Their first competition together was the Lake Placid Ice Dance Championships, where they placed third in the senior category, finishing fourth in the short dance and third in the free. They finished ninth at the 2016 U.S. Championships.

On September 13, 2016, Aldridge and Blackmer announced the end of their one-year partnership; she intended to continue competing with a new partner while he decided to retire from competition.

Programs

With Blackmer

With Eaton

Competitive highlights 
GP: Grand Prix; CS: Challenger Series; JGP: Junior Grand Prix

With Eaton

With Blackmer

References

External links 

 
 Alexandra Aldridge / Daniel Eaton at IceNetwork

American female ice dancers
1994 births
Living people
Sportspeople from Royal Oak, Michigan
World Junior Figure Skating Championships medalists
Four Continents Figure Skating Championships medalists
21st-century American women